Milon Tithi was an Indian Bengali language television soap that premiered on 23 November 2015 on Star Jalsha. The story primarily revolves around Aditya, Arjun, Ahona and Bonhi. It was produced by Acropoliis Entertainment Pvt. Ltd. and starred Riju Biswas, Ushasi Ray, Jeetu Kamal, Debjani Chakraborty and Ishaan Majumder in the lead roles. The show was replaced by Pratidaan.

Plot summary
Milon Tithi revolves around a male and two female characters:  Arjun, Ahona and Bonhi. Arjun is a rich, young man who liked Bonhi, yet married Ahona. Ahona is the daughter of a house owner and Bonhi is the daughter of a maid servant. Arjun always kept Bonhi happy, even with all her greedy needs. Ahona sees Bonhi as her best friend, but Bonhi dislikes Ahona and uses Arjun and separates him from Ahona. The story ends with Arjun and Ahona's separation.

Three-year leap
After three years everyone thinks Ahona is dead and that Bonhi killed Ahona's parents. Ahona vows revenge on Bonhi. Ahona has a son named Chiku, but he's actually Bonhi's son. A new man enters Ahona's life named Aditya. Aditya loves Ahona, yet Arjun still loves Ahona. He draws Ahona a painting every day. Bonhi has now become the owner of Mallick's villa. She is making the Mallick villa a living hell. Ahona ( Meera) buys the Mallick villa and returns the property papers to her father. Later, Bonhi and Mrinal get arrested and Bonhi and Mrinal confess all their crimes. Bonhi gets out of jail but Mrinal is sentenced to jail for seven years.

Three-month leap
After a few days, Ahona and Aditya marry and Bonhi's father appears. Ahona reunited Bonhi's father and mother. Later after many twists Bohni and Arjun get married forcibly by Ahona. There was a big conspiracy against Ahona and Aditya. The conspiracy is plotted by none other than Arjun. Later Arjun kidnaps Aditya on the day of his and Ahona's wedding but Bonhi gets to know that Arjun is the one who kidnapped Aditya. Later Ahona rescues Aditya from Arjun. Then Bonhi tells Ahona Arjun is behind all the kidnapping and everything else. Then, Ahona Aditya and Arjun Bonhi goes for honeymoon. There is a big conspiracy to kill Aditya plotted by Arjun. Ahona saves Aditya many times from Arjun. Later she gets to know everything is being plotted by Arjun. Later Bonhi in Ahona's avatar pushes Arjun from a cliff. But Arjun thinks it was Bonhi. She took Ahona's avatar so Ahona receives the entire blame.

One-year leap
Later Ahona aka Bonhi pushes Arjun over a cliff. But everyone thinks Ahona was the one who pushed Arjun from the cliff. Leaving everyone to think that Arjun had died one year ago. One year later, Chiku is four years old. Arjun comes back and pretends to be Jishnu who got lost many years ago by falling from a cliff. Arjun goes to Malick's house to take revenge on Ahona as Jishnu. Later it was revealed that it was not Ahona who pushed Arjun from a cliff actually it was Bonhi. She was the one who pushed Arjun from the cliff, in order to obtain all the property of Arjun. Later she joins hands with Jishnu ( Arjun) to ruin Aditya and Ahona's life. Later Mrinal comes back to seek revenge from Ahona. Bonhi calls Ahona and fakes that Rahul has kidnapped her and tells Ahona to come to a temple to rescue her. It turns out to be a fake kidnapping to trap Ahona in their evil plans. They will try to kill Ahona. Bonhi's true colors are revealed and she and Arjun are jailed for few months.

Six months leap
Everything is normal in the Mallick house. Bonhi writes a letter to Ahona that she will never come back in her life to trouble her. The show ends on a happy note on Chiku's sixth birthday.

Cast

Main
Ushashi Ray as Ahona Mallick / Bhaduri aka Meera - Sudhir's daughter, Bonhi's childhood friend, Arjun's ex-wife, Aditya's love interest turned wife (2015-2017)
Jeetu Kamal / Ishaan Majumdar as Arjun Mullick - Rudra's youngest son, Ahana's ex-husband, Bonhi's love interest turned husband (2015-2017)
Riju Biswas as Aditya Bhaduri - Ahona's love interest turned husband (2017)
Debjani Chakraborty as Bonhi Mullick (née Chowdhury) - Arjun's love-interest turned wife, Ahana's childhood friend and rival (2015-2017)

Recurring
Suchismita Chowdhury as Aditya's mother (2017)
Biresh Chakraborty as Mrinal - Bonhi's ex-fiancé, Ginia's love-interest (2016-2017)
Rajat Ganguly as Rudra Shekhar Mallick - Arjun's father (2015-2017)
Chitra Sen as Rudra Sekhar's mother, Arjun's paternal grandmother (2016)
Indranil Mallick as Riju Mallick - Arjun's younger brother (2015-2017)
Alivia Sarkar as Doyel Mullick (née Bhaduri) - Aditya's sister, Riju's wife (2017)
Aman Mehra as Abimanyu / Chiku, Bonhi's biological son, Ahona's adoptive son (2017)
Pinky Mallick as Sathi, Bonhi's mother (2015-2017)
Anirban Guha as late Sudhir Bose, Ahona's father (2015-2016)
Abanti Dutta as late Mita Bose, Ahona's mother (2015-2016)
Suvajit Kar as Deb (2016-2017)
Abhijit Deb Roy as Saikat Bose (2015-2017)
Mallika Majumdar as Shibani Mallik (2015-2017)
Swagata Basu as Debika Mallik (2015-2017)
Subhrajit Dutta as Aakash Mallik - Arjun's elder brother (2015-2017)
Sayantani Sengupta as Keya Mallik (2015-2017)
Pritha Chatterjee / Uma Bardhan as late Sohini Mallik (2015-2017)
Samata Chatterjee Lahiri as Jhilik (2015-2017)
Shankar Debnath as Sohini's husband, Rudra Sekhar's younger brother (2015-2017)
Madhurima Basak / Sanchari Mondal  as Ginia, Arjun's sister - Mrinal's love interest (2015-2017)
Raj Bhattacharya (2016-2017)
Runa Bandyapadhyay (2016-2017)
Arindam Banerjee as Anirban - Bonhi's biological father (2016-2017)

Adaptations

References

External links
 Milon Tithi at Hotstar

2015 Indian television series debuts
2017 Indian television series endings
Bengali-language television programming in India
Indian television soap operas
Star Jalsha original programming
Indian drama television series